Samuel Zell (born Shmuel Zielonka, September 28, 1941) is an American billionaire businessman. A former lawyer, Zell is the founder and chairman of Equity Group Investments, a private investment firm, founded in 1968. He has interests in and is the chairman of several public companies listed on the New York Stock Exchange: Equity Residential (EQR), Equity LifeStyle Properties (ELS),  Equity Commonwealth (EQC), and Covanta Holding Corp. (CVA), and Anixter.

As of February 2023, Zell had an estimated net worth of US $5.3 billion, according to Forbes.

Biography

Early life and education
Zell was born on September 28, 1941, in Chicago. His parents, Ruchla and Berek Zielonka, were Jewish immigrants from Poland, where his father had been a successful grain trader. They emigrated to the United States with their young daughter, Leah, via Tokyo. Soon after arriving, his parents changed their first and last names, becoming Rochelle and Bernard Zell. They then moved from Seattle to the Albany Park neighborhood in Chicago, where his father became a jewelry wholesaler. When he was twelve, the family moved to Highland Park, Illinois, where he graduated from Highland Park High School. In 1963, Zell graduated with a bachelor's degree from the University of Michigan, where he was also a member of the Alpha Epsilon Pi fraternity.

Career 
While in school, Zell entered the real estate business. He managed a 15-unit apartment building in return for free room-and-board. Soon, he was managing the owner's other properties. By his graduation, that venture was netting $150,000. Joined by his fraternity brother Robert H. Lurie, he won a contract with a large apartment development owner in Ann Arbor. By the time he graduated with a J.D. from the University of Michigan Law School in 1966, he and Lurie were managing over 4,000 apartments and owned 100–200 units outright. After school, he sold his interest in the management company to Lurie and moved to Chicago.

After graduation, Zell worked as a lawyer for one week before deciding that the legal profession was not for him. One of the senior partners decided to invest with him, enabling Zell to purchase an apartment building in Toledo. Zell also purchased several apartment buildings in Reno, Nevada, including Arlington Towers. In 1968, Zell founded the predecessor of Equity Group Investments and was joined a year later by his former partner, Robert H. Lurie. Together, they went on to grow the small firm into a vast enterprise, until Lurie's death in 1990.

Equity Group 
Equity Group Investments was the genesis for Equity Residential, the largest apartment owner in the United States; Equity Office Properties Trust, the largest office owner in the country; and Equity Lifestyle Properties, an owner/operator of manufactured home and resort communities.

In 2006, the Blackstone Group announced the purchase of Equity Office for $36 billion, which was the largest leveraged buyout in history at the time. Blackstone then sold many of the portfolio's properties for record amounts. By early 2009, most of the properties sold were "under water" (worth less than the mortgage).

Other investments
Zell affiliates owned the Schwinn Bicycle Company, the drugstore Revco, department store chain Broadway Stores, energy company Santa Fe Energy Resources, and mattress company Sealy. In 1985, Zell took over Itel Corporation.

Between 1992 and 1999, Zell's Chillmark fund owned Jacor Communications, Inc., a successful radio broadcast group that included a television station. The company was sold to Clear Channel Communications in 1999. On April 2, 2007, the Tribune Company announced its acceptance of Zell's offer to sponsor the going-private transaction of Chicago Tribune, the Los Angeles Times, and the company's other media assets. On December 20, 2007, Zell took the company private, and the following day he became the chairman and CEO. He sold the Chicago Cubs and the company's 25 percent interest in Comcast SportsNet Chicago. Under the burden of the debt incurred as part of Zell's leveraged buyout and in context of the unexpected severity of the Great Recession, the Tribune Co. filed for chapter 11 bankruptcy reorganization in December 2008.

In January 2008, Zell bought a controlling share in the Tribune Company, owner of the Chicago Tribune, among other newspapers. His decision to put Randy Michaels in charge was one of several moves that were sharply criticized by the employees. Besides creating a hostile workplace, Michaels laid off several employees while giving large bonuses to the executives. Less than a year after Zell bought the company, it tipped into bankruptcy, listing $7.6 billion in assets against a debt of $13 billion, making it the largest bankruptcy in the history of the American media industry. More than 4,200 people have lost jobs since the purchase, while resources for the Tribune newspapers and television stations have been slashed."

Philanthropy
Zell and his wife, Helen, philanthropic efforts focus heavily on education and the arts. In 1999, at the University of Michigan the Zell Lurie Institute for Entrepreneurial Studies and the Master of Fine Arts Creative Writing Program, Northwestern University's Kellogg School Zell Center for Risk Research and Zell Scholar Program, the University of Pennsylvania Wharton School's Zell/Lurie Real Estate Center, The Ounce of Prevention Fund, the Museum of Contemporary Art and the Chicago Symphony Orchestra.

Zell, according to The Forward, is also "a major donor to causes in Israel. His donations include a $3.1 million donation to the Herzliya Interdisciplinary Center in Israel and separate donations to the Israel Center for Social and Economic Progress, a free market oriented Israeli think tank founded by Daniel Doron. In the United States, he has given major gifts to such Jewish causes as the American Jewish Committee and the Bernard Zell Anshe Emet Day School, a Chicago Jewish primary school named after his father." Zell donated to Chicagoland Jewish High School renaming the school to Rochelle Zell Jewish High School, after his mother.

Political involvement
Zell donated $100,000 to Restore Our Future, the Super PAC supporting the 2012 presidential election campaign of Mitt Romney. In 2015 he donated $50,000 to the John Bolton Super PAC.

Criticism and controversies 
Zell is known for using "salty" language in the newsroom. In February 2008, the website LA Observed reprinted an internal memo that said:

In a June 2008 opinion piece for The Washington Post entitled, "The L.A. Times' Human Wrecking Ball", veteran Los Angeles-based editor and columnist Harold Meyerson took Zell to task for "taking bean counting to a whole new level", asserting that "he's well on his way to... destroying the L.A. Times." Comparing Zell to James McNamara, who was sentenced to life in prison for the notorious 1910 Los Angeles Times bombing (which killed 21 employees), Meyerson concluded his article by opining that "Life in San Quentin sounds about right" for Zell.

In 2008, Zell confirmed a plan to place the Chicago Cubs and Wrigley Field up for sale separately in order to maximize profits. He also announced he would consider selling naming rights to Wrigley Field. These announcements were widely unpopular in Chicago and a poll taken by the Chicago Sun-Times showed that 53% of 2,000 people who voted said they would no longer attend Cubs games if the field were renamed.

In 2010, The New York Times ran an article about Zell's and new top executive Randy Michaels's management of The Tribune Co. entitled "At Flagging Tribune, Tales of a Bankrupt Culture." The report details a culture promoting sexual harassment and debasement, with executives openly discussing the "sexual suitability" of employees in the office and a tight circle of executives who were earning tens of millions of dollars in bonuses despite being deep in bankruptcy and a failure to stem declining profits.

In June 2018, at a conference organized by Nareit, Sam Zell stated "I don't think there's ever been a 'We gotta get more pussy on the block'" when explaining his views of female discrimination on the workplace.

Personal life
Zell has been married three times and divorced twice; he has three children: son, Matthew and daughter, JoAnn, from his first marriage; and an adopted daughter, Kellie, from his second marriage. His third wife is Helen (née Herzog) Fadim Zell. He lives in Chicago, Illinois, and has homes in Sun Valley, Idaho and Malibu, California.

In May 2017, Zell released his book, Am I Being Too Subtle?: Straight Talk From a Business Rebel. The book was published by Portfolio and details his business philosophy on finding business and investment opportunities anywhere.

Awards and honors
1987, Golden Plate Award of the American Academy of Achievement
1999, Hall of Fame of the Chicago Association of Realtors
2007, Kellogg Award for Distinguished Leadership

Bibliography
 Am I Being Too Subtle?: Straight Talk From a Business Rebel (2017) 
 "The Grave Dancer: The Risky Art of Resurrecting Dead Properties," Real Estate Review (1982)
 "Pension Fund Perils in Real Estate," Real Estate Review 61 (Spring 1975).

References

External links
 The Zell Center for Risk Research at the Kellogg School of Management
 The Zell Lurie Institute at The University of Michigan
 The Samuel Zell and Robert Lurie Real Estate Center at Wharton School of the University of Pennsylvania
 The Zell entrepreneurship program at the Interdisciplinary Center in Israel

1941 births
Living people
20th-century American businesspeople
21st-century American businesspeople
American billionaires
American business writers
American finance and investment writers
American investors
American newspaper publishers (people)
American people of Polish-Jewish descent
American real estate businesspeople
American retail chief executives
Businesspeople from Chicago
Chicago Cubs owners
Illinois lawyers
Jewish American attorneys
Jewish American philanthropists
Philanthropists from Illinois
Private equity and venture capital investors
Tribune Publishing
University of Michigan Law School alumni
21st-century American Jews